Mosi Alli (born 3 July 1961) is a Tanzanian sprinter. She competed in the women's 100 metres at the 1980 Summer Olympics.

References

External links
 

1961 births
Living people
Athletes (track and field) at the 1980 Summer Olympics
Tanzanian female sprinters
Olympic athletes of Tanzania
Place of birth missing (living people)
Olympic female sprinters